Lamb of God is a 2008 Argentine drama film directed by Lucía Cedrón.

Cast 
 Mercedes Morán as Teresa, 2002
  as Teresa, 1978
 Jorge Marrale as Arturo
  as Guillermina
 Juan Minujín as Paco
 Ariana Morini
 María Izquierdo as María Paz, 2002
 Ignacia Allamand as María Paz, 1978

References

External links 

2008 drama films
2008 films
Argentine drama films
2000s Argentine films